The 1935 Philadelphia mayoral election saw the election of Samuel Davis Wilson.

Campaign
Wilson was a strong candidate. He had strong persuasive abilities, being able to take opposing positions on a topic while still seeming sincere. For instance, Wilson, as a mayoral candidate, condemned "out of control" federal spending. However, once elected mayor, in 1936 he would later assist in guaranteeing that 40,000 of his constituents were on the Works Progress Administration payroll.

Wilson was not completely loyal to the national Republican Party, as he had previously campaigned for Franklin Roosevelt in 1932.

Wilson was prone to taking a bare-knuckle approach to political discourse, not straying from referring to his opponents by pejoratives as “dirty rats” and “bare-faced liars.”

Having registered 179,000 new voters after the 1932 election cycle, Philadelphia Democrats hoped to finally take the mayoralty. Democrats believed they had recruited the ideal candidate with millionaire contractor and gold medal Olympian Jack Kelly. Kelly was an opponent of discrimination. He had, himself, been blocked from joining the upper echelons of Philadelphia Protestant society. Kelly reached out to Italians, Jews, and African Americans. He also made an effort to slightly diversify the down-ballot positions on the Democratic Party's ticket.

Results
The race proved to be the narrowest mayoral election that Philadelphia had seen in a long time.

Despite Kelly's efforts, 56% of black voters and half of Philadelphia's ethnic Italian electorate supported Wilson.

References

1935
Philadelphia
1935 Pennsylvania elections
1930s in Philadelphia